Christian Conti (born 2 August 1987, in Rome) is an Italian footballer who plays for Campus Eur 1960.

Biography
In July 2007, he failed to appear in the pre-season medical test for Bari. He then loaned to Pescara.
In July 2008, he was signed by Verona. In January 2010 he was signed by Como after "without" a club for 6 months, which Como borrowed Conti from Bari.

In October 2015, Conti joined Virtus Francavilla but left the club two months later and joined Italian club Play Eur. In mid-October 2018, Conti returned to Campus Eur for the third time. At the end of February 2016, he then moved to Serie D club Ostia Mare. In December 2016, he returned Play Eur.  The club later merged with Campus Eur and was named Campus Eur 1960 in August 2018. As of March 2019, Conti still played for Campus Eur 1960.

International career
Conti played for Italy U20 Serie C against Wales Semi-Professional team, which won 4–2. He represented Serie C1/B that losing to Serie C1/A representative team in the annual under-21 trophy.

References

External links
 
 

1987 births
Living people
Footballers from Rome
Italian footballers
Serie C players
Serie D players
S.S.C. Bari players
Ascoli Calcio 1898 F.C. players
S.S. Virtus Lanciano 1924 players
Delfino Pescara 1936 players
A.C. Perugia Calcio players
Hellas Verona F.C. players
Como 1907 players
Casertana F.C. players
S.S. Arezzo players
Virtus Francavilla Calcio players
Association football defenders